This is a list of Archaeological Protected Monuments in Puttalam District, Sri Lanka.

Notes

References

External links
 Department of Archaeology - Sri Lanka
 Ministry of Culture and the Arts

Archaeology
Archaeological protected monuments in Puttalam District
Buildings and structures in Puttalam District